Civil Aviation Flight University of China (abbreviated CAFUC) is the largest civil aviation university in Asia and the world's largest flight training institution. It is under the direct leadership of Civil Aviation Administration of China (CAAC). With its motto of Lofty Aspiration, Far-reaching Flight, Profound Knowledge and Great Perseverance, CAFUC describes itself as being dedicated to academic excellence, the well-being to Chinese civil aviation development. Consistently ranked as the top civil aviation institution in China, CAFUC enjoys the reputations of "the Cradle of Chinese Civil Aviation Pilots".

CAFUC is the only full-time regular institution of higher education mainly for civil aviation pilots and controllers, from which nearly 90% civil aviation captains and 50% air traffic controllers graduated. With its headquarter located in Guanghan City, Sichuan Province, CAFUC, covering a total area of 10.66 square kilometers (2636 acres), owns five airports as its sub-colleges for flight training, which are Xinjin Airport, Guanghan Airport, Luoyang Airport, Mianyang Airport, and Suining Airport.

CAFUC is the first integrate institution for Private Pilot License (PPL), Commercial Pilot License (CPL) and Airline Transport Pilot License (ATPL). Authorized by Civil Aviation Administration of China (CAAC), it's also the training and test center of examiners for International Civil Aviation Organization (ICAO) license tests for pilots and air traffic controllers. CAFUC also offers technological supports for the Legislation of Chinese Civil Aviation.

History
CAFUC was founded on May 26, 1956 by Civil Aviation Administration of China (CAAC) in the name of Aviation College of CAAC. On September 22 of the same year, CAFUC was transferred to the administration of Chinese National Defense and named after The 14th Aviation College of People's Liberation Army (PLA). On October 25, 1963, CAFUC became Advanced Chinese Civil Aviation College after a negotiation and discussion between CAAC and Chinese Air Force. On May 19, 1971, CAFUC was again brought into the system of Chinese Air Force. In 1980, CAFUC returned to the administration of CAAC and was listed among the colleges for higher education. Since December 15, 1987, CAFUC has been entitled as Civil Aviation Flight University of China.

Today CAFUC has more than 16,000 full-time students, 5 airports and 262 airplanes. There are more than 3300 faculties and 1300 teachers working in CAFUC. Among them there are more than 400 people who enjoy respectful titles such as first-class pilot, honored pilot, winner of special government allowance, expert in ICAO and senior engineer. CAFUC is the largest civil aviation university in Asia and has contributed more than 100,000 graduates for civil aviation of China as well as of other Asian and African countries.

Facilities
Besides covering a total area of 10.66 square kilometers (2636 acres), CAFUC also possesses various valuable facilities for education, worthing more than 6.2 billion Yuan (1 billion US dollars):

5 airports for flight training purpose, among which both Luoyang Airport and Mianyang Airport are also served as commercial airports with more than 1 million registered passenger traffic and total traffic movements;

In total 262 airplanes for different training levels and 45 sets of 360 degrees flight simulators;

The exclusively state-of-the-art air traffic control system with 360-degree full view built in the ATC tower building in campus;

More than 400 aircraft engines;

The largest library of civil aviation in China with more than 1 million books, more than 3 million e-books and 33 international database.

Research
CAFUC has in total 7 key labs including key national bases for scientific research of flight technology and aviation safety, digital simulation research lab (cooperate with Wisesoft Co., Ltd.) and key research lab for flight in plateau. In recent 5 years, CAFUC has launched 33 national projects such as ‘the 863 project’, Major Program of National Natural Science Foundation of China and Major Program of National Philosophy and Social Science Foundation of China, and won more than 127 national prizes in science and technology.

International Collaboration
CAFUC has received international students from countries in Asia and Africa since early 1960s, from which more than 6000 international students preparing to become pilots, air traffic controllers and maintenance personnel have achieved their graduation. Since then, CAFUC has established wide connections with a wealth of international organizations and companies including ICAO, IATA, FAA, Joint Aviation Authorities (JAA), Boeing, Airbus, EADS, SNECMA, GE and IAE. Since the year 2000, more than 5000 students have studied abroad in the US, UK and Australia. Currently there are about 25 visiting scholars from all over the world.

Academics 

CAFUC has 9 academic colleges/institutes, which are independently in charge of administration, scientific research and teaching organization.

College of Air Traffic Management
Air traffic control (national specialty major)

College of Flight Technology
Flight technology (national specialty major)

College of Flight Technology mainly conducts theoretical teaching for junior pilot students as well as for inflight pilots. Currently, the college has more than 80 faculty members which are involved in 4 teaching groups: Flight mechanics, Basis of flight technology, Aviation psychology and Navigation. Meanwhile, it has been a leading power in the research of flight technologies, security and human factors. The college is also home to some research/teaching labs including Flight simulation, Psychology of pilots, Wind tunnel and Advanced navigation technologies.

Aviation Engineering Institute

Air vehicle propulsion engineering
Aircraft manufacturing engineering
Electronic and information engineering
Electrical and automation engineering
Security engineering
Airworthiness engineering

Aviation Engineering Institute (AEI), established in April 2005, is an institute for education of aviation engineers and R&D of aviation technologies. Over ten years' development, AEI, from the beginning of ~300 students and ~30 faculty members, has transformed into the largest education and research college/institute within CAFUC including  ~3000 students and ~200 faculty members. Among the faculty, the lead design engineer of Shaanxi Y-8, consulting adviser of Civil Aviation Administration of China (CAAC), and graduates from top engineering institutes around the world are included. As such, AEI has contributed the largest portion to research funding within CAFUC and established research labs for technologies, including composites, wireless charging, virtual reality, real-time monitoring and non-destructive inspection. Graduates from AEI can now be found all over Chinese aviation industries and some aviation companies in the world including MTU Aero Engines, GE, FedEx and so on. AEI collaborates with other aviation institutes and companies, such as GE and SNECMA (Aero engine center), University of Washington at Seattle and Northwestern Polytechnical University (composite maintenance and certification center), and Eurocopter (helicopter training program).

School of Airport Engineering and Transportation Management
Business management
Marketing
Logistics management
Traffic engineering

School of Computer Technology
Computer science and technology
Information and computation science

School of Foreign Language Studies
English

School of Cabin Attendants
Cabin attendants

School of Air Security Protection
Air safety guard
Air security inspection

Center of Aviation English Study (School of Continuing Education)

Flight training airports

 Xinjin Airport
 Guanghan Airport
 Luoyang Airport
 Mianyang Airport
 Suining Airport

Notable alumni
Chen Feng (陈峰), the Founder and Chairman of HNA Group
Liu Shaoyong (刘绍勇), Chairman of China Eastern Airlines, former Chairman of China Southern Airlines
Si Xianmin, Chairman of China Southern Airlines
Yang Yuanyuan, former Director of the Civil Aviation Administration of China
Li Jian (李健), Vice Director of the Civil Aviation Administration of China
Xia Xinghua (夏兴华), Vice Director of the Civil Aviation Administration of China

References

 
Universities and colleges in Sichuan
Aviation schools in China